Stanley Augustus Patrick (May 5, 1922 – January 1, 2000) was an American National Basketball Association player.

Patrick played collegiate basketball at Santa Clara University before World War II. His roommate at Santa Clara was future Nevada Governor Paul Laxalt. After the advent of World War II, Patrick returned to the University of Illinois.

He played with the Waterloo Hawks and Sheboygan Red Skins during the 1949–50 NBA season.

Patrick had also played in the National Basketball League (NBL), and was named Rookie of the Year for the 1945–46 season.

References

1922 births
2000 deaths
American men's basketball players
Basketball players from Chicago
Chicago American Gears players
Flint Dow A.C.'s players
Forwards (basketball)
Guards (basketball)
Hammond Calumet Buccaneers players
High school basketball coaches in Illinois
High school football coaches in Illinois
Illinois Fighting Illini men's basketball players
Santa Clara Broncos men's basketball players
Sheboygan Red Skins players
Undrafted National Basketball Association players
Waterloo Hawks players